Film gauge is a physical property of photographic or motion picture film stock which defines its width. Traditionally, the major movie film gauges are 8 mm, 16 mm, 35 mm, and 65/70 mm (in this case 65 mm for the negative and 70 mm for the release print; the extra five millimeters are reserved for the magnetic soundtrack). There have been other historic gauges in the past, especially in the silent era, most notably 9.5 mm film, as well as a panoply of others ranging from 3 mm to 75 mm.

Larger film gauge is generally associated with higher image quality, higher image detail, greater materials expense, heavier camera equipment, larger and most costly projection equipment, as well as greater bulk and weight for distribution and storage (both interim and archival).

See also
Film format, with which film gauge is sometimes confused. While film gauge comprises part of a film format's definition, a film format also includes the standards for image capture and projection.

External links
One hundred years of film sizes
Running time calculator according to gauge, length and frame rate of the film

Film and video technology
Film formats